The Greece national under-21 football team is the national under-21 football team of Greece and is controlled by the Hellenic Football Federation, the governing body for football in Greece. The team competes in the European Under-21 Football Championship, held every two years.

The under-21 competition rules insist that players must be 21 or under at the start of a two-year competition, so technically it is up to an U-23 competition. To be eligible for the Greece National Team, all the football players must hold Hellenic (Greek) nationality and comply with the provisions of Article 15 of the regulations governing the Application of FIFA Statutes. A list of 35 football players must be submitted to the UEFA administration 30 days before the European Under-21 Football Championship opening match. Only 22 of the 35 players listed are authorised to take part in the final tournament and 3 of them must be goalkeepers.

As long as they are eligible, players can play at any level, making it possible to play for the U-21s, senior side and again for the U-21s, as Sotiris Ninis has done recently. It is also possible to play more than one country at youth level or different at youth level and different at senior level (providing the player is eligible). But a football player can represent only the senior national team that capped him first.

Also in existence are national teams for Under-20s (for non-UEFA tournaments), Under-19s and Under-17s. Greece also has a women's national team.

History
The first time that Greece's national team of hopes were formed was in 1968, with the aim of participating in the first Balkan Youth Championship that took place at the Kaftanzoglio Stadium in Thessaloniki.

In their maiden match she played with the corresponding team in Turkey and it was a draw without goals.

The first eleven were the following: Tourkomenis, B. Intzoglou (59' Dimitriou), Chaliambalias, Kyriazis, Athanasopoulos, Karafeskos, Filakouris, Sarafis (46' Stoligas), K. Papaioannou, Koudas, Kritikopoulos (70' Alexiadis).

In the following years, Greece won twice the Balkan Youth Championship (1969 and 1971), and they fought twice (1988 and 1998) in the final of the UEFA European Under-21 Championship.

Competition Record

As of 23 September 2022

UEFA European Under-21 Championship Record

Honours
 Balkan Youth Championship
  Winners (2): 1969, 1971
 Valeriy Lobanovskyi Memorial Tournament
  Third place (2):, 2015, 2018

Results and schedule
The following is a list of match results from the previous 12 months, as well as any future matches that have been scheduled.

2022

Euro 2023 Under-21 Championship qualification

2023 UEFA European Under-21 Championship qualification

Coaching staff

Managers 
The following table provides a summary of the complete record of each Greece team manager including their results regarding European Under-21 Championship.

Key: Pld–games played, W–games won, D–games drawn; L–games lost, %–win percentage

Last updated: 23 September 2022. Statistics include official FIFA-recognised matches only.

Players

Current squad

The following players were named in the squad for the friendly game against , to be played 24 March 2023.

Names in italics denote players who have been capped for the senior team.

Former squads
 2002 UEFA European Under-21 Championship squads – Greece
 1998 UEFA European Under-21 Championship squads – Greece
 1994 UEFA European Under-21 Championship squads – Greece

See also
 Greece national football team
 Greece national under-23 football team
 Greece national under-20 football team
 Greece national under-19 football team
 Greece national under-17 football team

References

External links
 Greece U-21 at HFF 
 Greece U-21 at UEFA
 UEFA European U-21 Championship at uefa.com

European national under-21 association football teams
under
Youth football in Greece